Richmond Wilcox "Dick" Landon (November 20, 1898 – June 13, 1971) was an American high jumper who won a gold medal at the 1920 Summer Olympics.

Landon attended the Hotchkiss School in Connecticut and Yale University. In 1922 he married Alice Lord, an Olympic diver he met on the boat to the 1920 Olympics.

Richmond Landon was a guest on the television show "I've Got A Secret" as one of five former Olympic champions which aired October 13, 1954.

References

External links

Official Website of the Olympics
profile

1898 births
1971 deaths
Hotchkiss School alumni
American male high jumpers
Olympic gold medalists for the United States in track and field
Athletes (track and field) at the 1920 Summer Olympics
People from Lynbrook, New York
People from Salisbury, Connecticut
Sportspeople from the New York metropolitan area
Track and field athletes from Connecticut
Medalists at the 1920 Summer Olympics
Yale University alumni